Hawa N'Diaye (born 30 November 1990) is a Senegalese handball player for Sambre Avesnois Handball and the Senegalese national team. 

She competed at the 2019 World Women's Handball Championship in Japan.

References

1990 births
Living people
Senegalese female handball players